Pantelis Kapetanos (born 8 June 1983) is a Greek former professional footballer who played as a striker and is known for his last minute goals and for the tendency to score them with his head, which he celebrates by covering his forehead with his forearm.

Club career

Kapetanos started his career in his native Greece, playing for Kozani, Iraklis and AEK Athens, with whom he competed in the UEFA Champions' League.

Steaua București
In July 2008 he joined Steaua București on a free transfer, signing a one-year contract. In his first season at Steaua, Kapetanos was the club's top scorer with Bogdan Stancu, scoring 11 goals. The Steaua board extended his contract for two years, and he finished the 2009–10 season as the club's leading scorer in Liga I, with 15 goals, and in all competitions, with 19 goals.

In January 2011 his contract with Steaua was terminated, as the team did not want to pay his high salary.

CFR Cluj
Although Steaua allowed Kapetanos to leave on a free transfer, they did not want to allow him to sign for another Liga I team. He joined CFR Cluj in January 2011, signing a three years and a half contract.

Due to the fact that he previously had to undergo surgery to fix a meniscus tear, he was sidelined for his first months at CFR Cluj. Kapetanos had a much better 2011–12 season, scoring 12 goals to help CFR Cluj claim their third title in five years.

On 14 July 2012, Kapetanos scored a late goal in extra time to help his team reach the Penalty shoot-out against Dinamo București in the 2012 Romanian Supercup. CFR Cluj lost at the penalty kicks and the trophy went to Dinamo.

Second spell in Steaua București
On 3 September 2013, Steaua București announced that they have reached agreement with CFR Cluj for the transfer of Pantelis Kapetanos.

Skoda Xanthi
On 11 July 2014, after six years, Kapetanos returned to Greece by joining Skoda Xanthi on a two-year contract, as a free agent.

Kapetanos as a reserved for the Greek Cup final, pulled one goal back for Skoda Xanthi in the 87th minute from close range.

Veria
After being released on a free transfer from Xanthi, Kapetanos signed a one-year contract to Veria. After Veria's relegation he left the club.

After spending 6 months in Veria, Kapetanos left Veria in January 2017. In July 2018, there were rumors for his transfer to Iraklis .

International career
Kapetanos was called up by Greece for the first time ahead of its international friendly against Senegal. He was included in the squad for the 2010 FIFA World Cup, and made his World Cup debut in a group stage match against South Korea.

Personal life
He is the elder brother of Kostas Kapetanos who plays for A.E. Karaiskakis. He is married to fellow Greek, Fotini Dougali and they have three children together.

Career statistics

Club
(Correct as of 23 April 2017)

Honours
Steaua București:
Romanian League: 2013–14
Romanian Cup: 2010–11
CFR Cluj:
Romanian League: 2011–12

References

External links

1983 births
Living people
Greek footballers
Greek expatriate footballers
Association football forwards
Greece under-21 international footballers
Greece international footballers
AEK Athens F.C. players
Iraklis Thessaloniki F.C. players
Kozani F.C. players
FC Steaua București players
CFR Cluj players
Xanthi F.C. players
Veria F.C. players
Liga I players
Super League Greece players
Expatriate footballers in Romania
2010 FIFA World Cup players
Footballers from Ptolemaida
Greek expatriate sportspeople in Romania